The men's heptathlon event at the 2019 European Athletics Indoor Championships was held on 2 and 3 March.

Medalists

Records

Results

60 metres

Long jump

Shot put

High jump

60 metres hurdles

Pole vault

1000 metres

Final results

References

2019 European Athletics Indoor Championships
Combined events at the European Athletics Indoor Championships